Pierre Amont N'Diaye (born 21 April 1944) is a Senegalese boxer. He competed in the men's bantamweight event at the 1972 Summer Olympics. At the 1972 Summer Olympics, he lost to George Turpin of Great Britain.

References

External links
 

1944 births
Living people
Senegalese male boxers
Olympic boxers of Senegal
Boxers at the 1972 Summer Olympics
Place of birth missing (living people)
Bantamweight boxers
20th-century Senegalese people
21st-century Senegalese people